Jacques Cotta (1908 – 1971) was a French politician, lawyer, journalist.  He was a member of the SFIO party.  He served as Mayor of Nice from 1945 to 1947. He was elected mayor of Nice in 1945 against the communist Virgile Barel. He was also member of the French Resistance. He lost the municipal election of 1947 during which Jean Médecin won.

Biography
Jacques Cotta was born in Nice, France on 1908 and died in Nice, France on 1971. Jacques Cotta was married and has two children's.

References 

1908 births
1971 deaths
People from Nice
French Section of the Workers' International politicians
20th-century French politicians
Mayors of Nice
French Resistance members